Her Alibi is a 1989 American romantic comedy film directed by Bruce Beresford, written by Charlie Peters and starring Tom Selleck, Paulina Porizkova, William Daniels, and James Farentino.

Plot
Phil Blackwood (Selleck) is an American mystery novelist who has fallen into a rut with predictable plots and declining sales. He is floundering attempting to write a new novel, well behind schedule, and wastes time watching trials in court, where he is known as a regular among other regular spectators.

He is stunned when he sees a dazzling Romanian murder suspect named Nina (Porizkova) arraigned in the court. Instantly falling for her, he believes she cannot possibly be a murderer. To assure himself of this, he poses as a Roman Catholic priest in order to meet Nina while she is held pending her bail appearance. Finding her wearing a crucifix necklace (which would be forbidden in her communist homeland), he thinks she's innocent when she does not confess to the murder.

With the help of his friend and literary agent, Sam (Daniels), Blackwood invents an alibi ("We're having an affair.") to secure her release under his custody, and he gets Sam to help. However, after Blackwood succeeds in this, Sam raises the frightening idea that she really might be a murderer, and that Blackwood might be in danger.

Blackwood takes Nina to live under supervision in his house. However, he now finds himself alternatively entranced with her and terrified of her, as he finds himself wondering if she really could be a murderer. For one, she is extraordinarily proficient with throwing knives, as he found when she killed a large insect that was very close to him. Then there was the incident when she shot him with an arrow, an accident, of course. There are also the mysterious phone calls she makes that he overhears. He becomes so afraid that he decides to barricade his bedroom door, moving furniture up against his door, saying it is part of his exercise regimen. Although he is afraid at times, he is also fascinated, and cannot help himself.

There are plots going on around Blackwood that he does not understand, as the real murderers (operatives from Romania's Securitate), are attempting to kidnap Nina. She, too, has her own agenda of arranging the defection of her family to America. Blackwood is stumbling through all of this, as he is inspired to write scenes involving her and his series hero, but expressing the reality of both his attraction to her and his doubts and fears about her in the storyline.

Nina for her part is wondering about this man who has suddenly appeared to help her, and she has doubts about him as well. She eventually finds his manuscript in his office and reads it, and she becomes aware of his feelings and doubts. She is dismayed by his lack of faith in her, since she has begun to truly appreciate him.

This is when she runs away to be at The Funeral of Grimaldi, an event celebrated by clowns to celebrate the life of the famous clown Joseph Grimaldi. This is the climax to the film, when the Romanian agents attempt to grab her, Blackwood rushes to protect her, and her plans to defect all come to a head.

In the afterword to this story line, Nina and her family have successfully defected, Blackwood's book (Her Alibi) has been published and become a great success, and Blackwood and Nina have their happily ever after. "But then, do you ever really know the person you love?" is the final message of the film.

Cast
 Tom Selleck as Phil Blackwood
 Paulina Porizkova as Nina
 William Daniels as Sam
 James Farentino as Frank
 Hurd Hatfield as Troppa
 Victor Argo as Auran
 Patrick Wayne as Gary Blackwood
 Tess Harper as Sally Blackwood

Reception
The film was met with negative reviews. On Rotten Tomatoes it has an approval rating of 17% based on reviews from 23 critics. On Metacritic it has a score of 24% based on reviews from 15 critics, indicating "generally unfavorable reviews".

Although it was Porizkova's best-known film appearance, her role as Nina in Her Alibi earned her a 1990 Golden Raspberry nomination for Worst Actress.

References

External links
 
 

1989 films
Films about writers
1980s English-language films
1980s Romanian-language films
1989 romantic comedy films
Films scored by Georges Delerue
Films shot in Baltimore
Warner Bros. films
Films directed by Bruce Beresford
American romantic comedy films
1989 multilingual films
American multilingual films
1980s American films